Maria Rachiteleva (born 19 February 1993 in Astrakhan) is a Russian female handballer who plays as a left wing for the Russian club HC Astrakhanochka.

Achievements
Russian Championship: 
Bronze Medalist: 2013, 2015
EHF Cup: 
Semifinalist: 2014

References

1993 births
Living people
Sportspeople from Astrakhan
Russian female handball players